Arun Vijay (born 19 November 1977), formerly known as Arun Kumar,  is an Indian actor who works primarily in Tamil cinema. He also starred in a few films in Telugu, Kannada and Hindi.

Born as Arun Kumar and being the only son of veteran actor Vijayakumar, he debuted in Sundar C's Murai Mappillai (1995). He received early success in Thulli Thirintha Kaalam (1998) and Pandavar Bhoomi (2001). 

After a string of failures, he changed his name to Arun Vijay and achieved breakthrough success and recognition for playing lead roles in Malai Malai (2009), Maanja Velu (2010), Thadaiyara Thaakka (2012), Kuttram 23 (2017), Chekka Chivantha Vaanam (2018), Thadam (2019), Mafia: Chapter 1 (2020) and Yaanai (2022). He is noted for his villanous roles in Yennai Arindhaal (2015), Bruce Lee: The Fighter (2015) and Chakravyuha (2016).

He is a recipient of many awards, including a  Norway Tamil Film Festival Award, two  Filmfare South Awards, a Edison Award and three  SIIMA Awards.

Early life
Arun Vijay was born as the only son to actor Vijayakumar and his first wife Muthukannu. He studied at Don Bosco Maticulation Higher Secondary School, Egmore. After completing his schooling, he joined Loyola college for his higher studies.

His two elder sisters Kavitha and Anitha, who had debuted in the 1995 Tamil film, Coolie,

Career

1995-2001
Vijay had a desire to act since childhood. He developed a strong interest by watching his father during film shoots. Vijay started getting film offers when he was in tenth grade but his father wanted him to complete his schooling before acting in films.

Vijay signed on for an A. R. Rahman musical Love Story to be his acting debut, but the delay of that project meant that he accepted Anbalaya Films' offer of Sundar C's Murai Mappillai (1995). He was 18 years old when he signed to act in Murai Mapillai. This made him one of the youngest actors to debut as a hero in the Tamil film industry. Murai Mapillai had a star cast which included Manivannan, K. Prabakaran, Kalaranjini, Goundamani and Senthil. The film was released in December 1995.

In 1996, Vijay's second film, Priyam, was released. Vijay then signed for two films Kathirunda Kadhal and Ganga Gowri under Ganga Gowri Productions. Both were released in 1997. Kathirunda Kadhal was Arun's first film with Suvalakshmi.

In 1998, Vijay played the lead role in director Balasekaran's film Thulli Thirintha Kaalam. It was produced by Kavithalayaa Productions, a company owned by K.Balachander. The film was a commercial success and was later remade in Telugu with a different cast.

In 2000, Vijay featured in two films, Kannaal Pesavaa and Anbudan. Kannal Pesavaa was released in August 2000 and was his second film with actors Suvalakshmi, Goundamani and Senthil. Anbudan, released in November 2000, had two heroines Meena and Rambha. His career hit a nadir when Buddhan, a project which he had physically transformed for, was stalled and dropped in 2000.

In 2001, he played a civil engineer in Pandavar Bhoomi, directed by Cheran. This was the first movie in which Vijay and his father Vijayakumar acted together. This movie won the Tamil Nadu State Film Award for Best Film (Second Prize) in 2001.

2002-2012
Vijay's next film was Mutham (2002). It was initially titled Muthamidalamma, but was changed after the censor screening. It was directed by S.A. Chandrasekhar and was the first film to be shot using digital cinematography in Tamil cinema. Vijay had a special appearance in Iyarkai (2003), which won the National Film Award for Best Feature Film in Tamil.

He acted in director Ramesh Selvan's Jananam (2004). The film's actress Priyanka Trivedi could not fulfill her scheduled commitments in the film, as she got married in 2003. The film failed to make a mark, as the screenplay was not good and the story was incomplete. Critics appreciated Arun Vijay's acting in the movie. In 2006, he has given a matured performance in Azhagai Irukkirai Bayamai Irukkirathu. His next projects was Thavam (2007) and Vedha (2008). Thavam was the first film to credit Arun Kumar under his new name Arun Vijay.

The first venture, Malai Malai (2009), directed by A. Venkatesh, became a commercial success. The next, Maanja Velu (2010), by the same team, was also a success. Arun Vijay appeared in Magizh Thirumeni's action-thriller Thadaiyara Thaakka (2012), marking a move away from his previous two Masala films.

2015-present

He starred in Yennai Arindhaal (2015) with actor Ajith Kumar. This was his first film with director Gautham Vasudev Menon. Vijay played the role of Victor, an antagonist.

On September 1, 2015, Vijay launched his own production company called In Cinemas Entertainment (ICE). He said that he launched the company to identify and provide an opportunity to ambitious and talented youngsters.

The same year, he debuted in Telugu in the film Bruce Lee - The Fighter (2015) as the lead antagonist. He also made his Kannada debut as the lead antagonist in the movie Chakravyuha in 2016. His next, Kuttram 23 (2017), returning to lead roles, was a success at the box office. His next movie was Chekka Chivantha Vaanam (2018), which was directed by Mani Ratnam with an ensemble cast.

In 2019, Vijay acted in Thadam, an action crime thriller. He played his first double role in this film. This was also the second film in which he and Magizh Thirumeni worked together, after Thadaiyara Thaakka. The film was loosely based on various real-life crimes where the suspects are identical twins. Thadams biggest strength was Vijay's convincing performance as Kavin and Ezhil. In the action thriller film Saaho, Prabhas was the hero while Vijay played a supporting role. In 2020, he appeared in action crime thriller Mafia: Chapter 1 that was directed by Karthick Naren. In the film, Arun Vijay played a narcotics police officer on a mission to hunt down a drug mafia kingpin.

In 2022, he appeared in the Amazon Prime Video film Oh My Dog. The cast included Vijay, his father Vijayakumar, and his son Arnav Vijay. The next was Yaanai an action drama film written and directed by Hari. The next was released a Web Series Tamil Rockerz. and later Sinam directed by G. N. R. Kumaravelan, it is made as an investigative whodunit thriller in which Arun Vijay plays a cop. Arun Vijay delivers a stunning performance once again. The role of an angry cop is tailor-made for an actor with his physique and attitude.

Personal life
In 2006, Vijay married Aarathi, daughter of film producer Dr. N. S. Mohan with whom he has a daughter, Purvi and a son, Arnav Vijay. In 2010, Arun Vijay's eldest sister Kavitha's daughter Hasini married N. S. Mohan's son Hemanth, who is a co-producer of Feather Touch Entertainments and also acted alongside Arun Vijay in Malai Malai.

Filmography

Films
Note: He was credited as Arunkumar (sometimes Arun) from 1995 to 2006. He was credited as Arun Vijay from 2007 onwards.
All films are in Tamil, unless otherwise noted.

Web series

As dubbing artist

Awards and nominations

References

External links
 

Indian male film actors
Tamil male actors
Living people
Male actors in Tamil cinema
1977 births
Male actors in Telugu cinema
Male actors in Kannada cinema